Bell Awards may refer to:

 Australian Jazz Bell Awards - music awards for the jazz music genre in Australia.
 Bell Awards for Publishing Excellence - an Australian Publishing Industry award list.
 Bert Bell Award - for the Professional American football Player of the Year.
Carolyn Shaw Bell Award - given by the American Economic Association to economists who promote the success of women in the economics profession
 Grand Bell Awards - film awards presented in South Korea